The Amuay tragedy was an explosion of the Paraguaná Refinery Complex in Punto Fijo, Venezuela. The explosion resulted in the death of 48 people and injured 151 others.

Explosion 

On 25 August 2012 at 01:11 (05:41 GMT), an explosion caused by the ignition of a leaking gas at the Amuay refinery killed 48 people, primarily National Guard troops stationed at the plant, and injured 151 others. A 10-year-old boy was among the dead.

In addition to the refinery, more than 1,600 homes were damaged by the shockwave.

Reactions 
Three days of national mourning was declared by President Hugo Chávez. He also ordered a probe into the cause of the fire. Chávez said he was creating a US$23 million fund for clean-up operations and a replacement of destroyed homes. He said that "60 new homes were ready for affected families to move into, 60 more would be finished soon, and a further 137 houses would be handed over next month." He also rejected claims that PDVSA might be responsible for the disaster. The first were extinguished by 28 August 2012.

Venezuelan presidential candidate Henrique Capriles Radonski criticized PDVSA management for their poor safety record and forwarded lack of maintenance as a cause of the accident. President Chávez, who claimed that it was too early to identify the cause, as well as minister Ramírez, said that Capriles did not "know what he's talking about". Iván Freites, the Secretary-General of the United Federation of Oil Workers, held the government responsible "lack of maintenance and investment" in the industry, considering it the main cause of the explosion. Freites denounced that since 2011, the union of oil workers had complained about problems with "damaged equipment, lack of spare parts and other unsafe conditions".

See also 

 El Palito oil spill

References

External links 

Explosions in 2012
2012 industrial disasters
2012 in Venezuela
Fires in Venezuela
Industrial fires and explosions
Man-made disasters in Venezuela
2012 fires in South America
2012 disasters in Venezuela
PDVSA